The Orleans Club was a London-based cricket club that existed from 1878 to 1888 and took part in four first-class matches. It was founded by C. I. Thornton who had organised occasional teams to play on the Orleans Club Ground at Orleans Road, Twickenham, both the club and ground taking the name of the address.

References

Bibliography
 

Organizations established in 1878
Sports clubs established in the 1870s
English cricket in the 19th century
Former senior cricket clubs
1878 establishments in England